Roberto Merino Ramírez (born 19 May 1982) is a Peruvian professional footballer who plays as an attacking midfielder.

He also holds Spanish citizenship, due to the many years spent in the country.

Club career
Having moved to Spain in his teens after being born in Chiclayo, Lambayeque Region, Merino played youth football with FC Barcelona (only one year) and RCD Mallorca. He made his senior debuts with the latter's reserves, in Segunda División B.

In January 2003, Merino joined Atlético Malagueño, being an important midfielder element as Málaga CF's B-team retained their newly acquired status in Segunda División, with the player having contributed with 20 games and five goals to the promotion (play-offs included). Subsequently, he moved to Switzerland and signed with Servette FC but, with the club facing bankruptcy, left in the following transfer window to Ciudad de Murcia – also in Spain's second level – alongside teammate João Paulo Daniel.

Merino was signed by Atromitos F.C. in January 2006, from fellow Super League Greece side Akratitos FC. In February 2009, after two full seasons and two halves, he changed teams (and countries) again, joining U.S. Salernitana 1919 in Italy.

On 8 January 2011, Merino signed with Al-Nasr SC of the Kuwaiti Premier League, on loan from Salernitana. Less than one month after, however, he left the Asian club; according to the player, he decided to leave because he did not feel comfortable and had other objectives for his football career.

On 28 February 2011, Merino signed a half-season contract with Unión Comercio– at almost 29, this marked the first time he would be playing in the Peruvian Primera División. He stated that his main reason for joining was to earn a regular starting spot on the Peru national team.

International career
Merino represented Spain at under-18 level, having already spent several years living in the country. He decided to play for Peru as a senior, earning his first and only cap on 7 June 2009 in a 1–2 home loss against Ecuador for the 2010 FIFA World Cup qualifiers.

Personal life
Merino's younger brother, Iván, was also a footballer. A defender, he too represented Mallorca B and Salernitana.

Honours

Club
Juan Aurich
Peruvian Primera División: 2011

References

External links

Gazzetta dello Sport profile 

1982 births
Living people
People from Chiclayo
Peruvian people of Spanish descent
Peruvian footballers
Spanish footballers
Association football midfielders
Segunda División players
Segunda División B players
RCD Mallorca B players
Atlético Malagueño players
Ciudad de Murcia footballers
Swiss Super League players
Servette FC players
Super League Greece players
A.P.O. Akratitos Ano Liosia players
Atromitos F.C. players
Serie B players
Serie C players
U.S. Salernitana 1919 players
A.S.G. Nocerina players
Al-Nasr SC (Kuwait) players
Peruvian Primera División players
Unión Comercio footballers
Juan Aurich footballers
Universidad Técnica de Cajamarca footballers
Categoría Primera A players
Deportes Tolima footballers
Roberto Merino
Roberto Merino
Spain youth international footballers
Peru international footballers
Peruvian expatriate footballers
Expatriate footballers in Spain
Expatriate footballers in Switzerland
Expatriate footballers in Greece
Expatriate footballers in Italy
Expatriate footballers in Kuwait
Expatriate footballers in Colombia
Expatriate footballers in Thailand
Peruvian expatriate sportspeople in Spain
Peruvian expatriate sportspeople in Greece
Peruvian expatriate sportspeople in Italy
Peruvian expatriate sportspeople in Colombia
S.E.F. Torres 1903 players
Kuwait Premier League players
Peruvian expatriate sportspeople in Kuwait